Daniel Breitholtz, born 18 October 1977, is a former A&R-manager at Sony BMG. Together with voice coach Kishti Tomita, manager and talent scout Peter Swartling and producer, musician and disc jockey, he was part of the Idol 2004, Idol 2005, Idol 2006 and Idol 2007 jury.

Breitholtz has a history with artists like Whitney Houston, Westlife, Outkast and Toni Braxton. Breitholtz has also been a publisher for some of the most successful songwriters, who have written music for Celine Dion, Britney Spears, Westlife and Christina Aguilera among others. Since April 2016 Breitholtz has worked as the Senior Music Programmer at Spotify.

References

External links
 
  Allears.se

1977 births
Living people
Swedish record producers
Idols (franchise) participants
Swedish television personalities